Mark Lukych Kropyvnytskii (7 May 1840 – 21 April 1910), commonly known as Marko Kropyvnytskyi, was a Ukrainian writer, dramaturge, composer, theatre actor and director. Over his career Kropyvnytskyi wrote 40 plays, played in over 500 roles of various repertoire, as well as wrote several songs.

In 1875, he was invited by Theophilia Romanovich to the theatrical society "Ruska Besida", and is attributed to be one of the founders of the first professional Ukrainian theatre, The Ruska Besida Theater.

Early years 
Marko Lukych Kropyvnytskyi was born on 7 May 1840 in Bezhbayraky village (now Kropyvnytske), in what was then Kherson Governorate of the Russian Empire, into the family of nobleman Luka Ivanovych and Kapitolina Ivanivna (née Dubrovynska) Kropyvnytskyi.

Early career 
In 1862 as an audit student, Kropyvnytskyi attended classes at the Law Faculty of Kiev University. Deeply impressed by a melodrama he saw in Kiev Theatre, he wrote the play "Mykyta Starostenko, or You do know when disaster will awake". He later criticized this work as it was an attempt by inexperienced author. Now the play is known in the version, that has undergone numerous fundamental revisions. Kropyvnytskyi had not completed his education for various reasons; yet he constantly complemented to his knowledge independently, especially after he moved to Elisavetgrad, where there was a library. There, he had a chance to get acquainted with Robert Owen, John Stuart Mill, William Shakespeare, Lord Byron, Johann Wolfgang von Goethe, Heinrich Heine, Alexandre Dumas, George Sand, and William Makepeace Thackeray, among other writers. In his government service, Kropyvnytskyi was rarely promoted, and often completely lost his earnings, due to his devotion for art and amateur performances.

In 1871, Kropyvnytskyi joined the troupe of professional actors, and agreed to work in the company of Count Morkov, in Odessa. He gained a great theatrical experience after spending over ten years in the Russian theatre troupe; he thoroughly studied the specific rules of theatre genre and learned the place of theatre in society.

In 1872 the Odessa newspaper "Novorossiysk Telegraph" published two musical comedies by Kropyvnytskyi: Reconciled and God will protect an orphan, or Unexpected Proposal.

In 1875, Kropyvnytskyi went on tour in Galicia, where he worked as an actor and director of the theatre company "Ruthenian talk"; he has made some effort to change the repertoire and artistic style of the theatre in bringing it to the realism and national character.

Creating the Coryphee Theatre 
In 1881, the ban on Ukrainian theatre was abolished. Though there still were many limitations and restrictions, Ukrainian troupes emerged in Kyiv, Kharkiv, and Odessa. Yet, these troupes did not satisfy Kropyvnytskyi, who sought for dramatic changes in scenic art. In 1882, he organised his own company which, after around a year, merged with the Mykhailo Starytsky troupe, and Marko Kropyvnytskyi became a leading director there. A new era in the history of Ukrainian professional theatre began. Many famous actors played in Kropyvnytskyi's troupe, such as Maria Zankovetska, Mykola Sadovsky, later M.Sadovska-Barilotti, Panas Saksahansky, and Ivan Karpenko-Kary.

In his early days, Kropyvnytskyi wrote mainly comedy pieces: Reconciled (1869), God will protect an orphan, or Unexpected Proposal (1871), Actor Sinitsa (1871), A revision (1882), Mustache (1885) and others.

Later period 
In 1890s, Kropyvnytskyi called his pieces "pictures" on multiple occasions, such as his "pictures of rural movement" ("Konon Blyskavychenko", 1902, "Tough Day", 1906), "pictures of rural life" ("Old bitch and young shoots», 1908) etc.

Even in his later years, forced by worsening health to settle in a farm House, Kropyvnytskyi often travelled to participate in theatre performances, he continued writing plays. Kropyvnytskyi bothered for organization of a school for farmers and their children, created two plays for children, using folk motifs (Ivasik-Telesyk, On the wave of the wand), and worked on its staging at the farm.

Kropyvnytskyi died on 21 April 1910 on his way from Odessa, where he was on tour. He was buried in Kharkiv.

Legacy

In July 2016 the city of Kirovohrad was renamed Kropyvnytskyi in his honour.

In 2008 Marko's grandson, Ihor Kropyvnytskyi said the following, "Created by Marko Kropyvnytskyi under conditions of a brutal national oppression, the professional theatre was one of main sources of cultural revival of the yoked nation during many years, particularly considering that many of our compatriots were illiterate at that time and were not able to read wonderful poetry and stories of Taras Shevchenko, Marko Vovchok, Ivan Franko and other Ukrainian writers. The Marko Kropyvnytskyi Theatre gave not only an extraordinary push for further development of Ukrainian culture, but also played a prominent socio-political role in the life of Ukrainians, became one of important spiritual foundations on which many decades later was built independent Ukrainian state".

About Kropyvnytskyi, Maksym Rylsky wrote the following, "Let's lower our foreheads: a genius was here, for people he worked and was tormented, so that the people would be treated just, so that the land would be green in garden's bloom".

See also
 Mykola Voronyi

References

External links

 Revutsky, V. Marko Kropyvnytsky. Encyclopedia of Ukraine
 Kropyvnytskyi, I. Father of the Ukrainian Theatre (Батько українського театру). Newspaper "Den". 22 May 2008.
 Kropyvnytskyi, I. A concert in the middle of the steppe (Концерт серед степу). Newspaper "Den". 15 January 2009.
 Kropyvnytskyi, I. Ukrainian Shakespeare (Український Шекспір). Newspaper "Den". 20 May 2010.
 Mushtenko, S. Time of coryphées (Час корифеїв). Newspaper "Den". 14 December 2007.
 
 

1840 births
1910 deaths
People from Kirovohrad Oblast
People from Yelisavetgradsky Uyezd
Ukrainian people in the Russian Empire
Ukrainian nobility
Ukrainian dramatists and playwrights
Ukrainian male stage actors
Ukrainian male writers
Ukrainian composers
Ukrainian theatre directors
Ukrainian Discourse Theatre
Dramaturges
Male dramatists and playwrights
19th-century Ukrainian male actors
19th-century Ukrainian dramatists and playwrights
19th-century male writers
20th-century Ukrainian male actors
20th-century dramatists and playwrights
20th-century male writers